"Can't Find My Way Home" is a song written by Steve Winwood that was first released by Blind Faith on their 1969 album Blind Faith. Rolling Stone, in a review of the album, noted that the song featured "Ginger Baker's highly innovative percussion" and judged the lyric "And I'm wasted and I can't find my way home" to be "delightful".

Cover versions
The song has been covered by many musicians. Brazilian singer and tropicalist composer Gilberto Gil recorded it on his 1971 studio album "Gilberto Gil" (a live version appeared as bonus track on CD as well). American blues guitarist Bonnie Raitt sang the song during her 1972 concert series. A bootleg recording with Raitt, Lowell George, John P. Hammond and Freebo has more than five million views on YouTube. Eric Clapton tapped Yvonne Elliman to sing the song during his 1976–77 concert tours, giving her the stage while he took a break. American glam metal band House of Lords covered the song on their 1990 album Sahara. Two notable versions have been heard on screen: one by American singer Alana Davis in 1999's The Mod Squad film, and another by American bluegrass singer Alison Krauss for the 2003 soundtrack of Crossing Jordan, a television series. In 2018, Australian-American singer Rachael Price covered the song on Live from Here with Chris Thile on mandolin.

Personnel 
 Steve Winwood – vocals, guitars, keyboards
 Eric Clapton – guitars
 Ric Grech – bass guitar
 Ginger Baker – drums, percussion

References 

1969 songs
Songs written by Steve Winwood
British folk rock songs
Swans (band) songs
Song recordings produced by Jimmy Miller